The women's 100 metre breaststroke competition of the swimming events at the 1975 Pan American Games took place on 20 October. The last Pan American Games champion was Sylvia Dockerill of Canada.

This race consisted of two lengths of the pool, both lengths being in breaststroke.

Results
All times are in minutes and seconds.

Heats

Final 
The final was held on October 20.

References

Swimming at the 1975 Pan American Games
Pan